Brightside (stylised in all caps) is the fourth studio album by American indie folk band the Lumineers, released on January 14, 2022, through Dualtone and Decca Records. It was primarily produced by Simone Felice and David Baron. The album was preceded by the release of three singles: the title track, "Big Shot", and "A.M. Radio".

Recording
Simone Felice, producer of the Lumineers' Cleopatra and III, returned to produce the album alongside David Baron, who also served as mixer and engineer. The album was recorded in two sessions that took place in early ("winter and spring") 2021 at Baron's Sun Mountain Studios in Boiceville, New York. Lead single "Brightside" was recorded in a single day.

Singer-guitarist Wesley Schultz and Jeremiah Fraites performed most of the instrumentation themselves, with Baron providing keyboards and backing vocals. Other contributions came from the Felice Brothers' James Felice, singer-songwriter Diana DeMuth, touring members Byron Isaacs and Lauren Jacobson, and backing singer Cindy Mizelle.

Critical reception

Upon release, Brightside received positive reviews from music critics. At Metacritic, which assigns a normalized rating out of 100 to reviews from critics, the album has an average score of 72 out of 100, which indicates "generally favorable reviews" based on 4 reviews.

Track listing

Notes
 All tracks in the standard track listing are stylized in all caps.

Personnel
Credits adapted from the media notes of Brightside.

The Lumineers
 Wesley Schultz – lead vocals, electric guitar, acoustic guitar
 Jeremiah Fraites – piano, drums, drum programming, Firewood, Rhodes, electric guitar, tambourine, electric bass, glockenspiel

Additional musicians
 Simone Felice – background vocals, tambourine, claps, maracas
 David Baron – synthesizers, Rhodes, sub bass, Hammond B3, minimoog, mellotron
 Lauren Jacobson – violin, background vocals
 Byron Isaacs – bass, background vocals
 Diana DeMuth – background vocals
 James Felice – background vocals
 Cindy Mizelle – background vocals
 Alex Waterman – cello
 Palenville Firehouse – siren

Production
 Simone Felice – producer
 David Baron – producer, mixing, engineering
 Andrew Mendelson – mastering
 Taylor Chadwick – assistant engineer
 Andrew Darby – assistant engineer
 Bobbi Giel – assistant engineer
 Luke Armentrout – assistant engineer
 Renée Hikari – studio assistant
 Brian Hubble – piano technician
 Rick Mullen – guitar technician
 Derek Brown – drum technician
 Sara Full – studio coordinator
 Anthony Hook – Sara Full's assistant

Artwork
 Nicholas Sutton Bell – creative director, photographer

Charts

References

2022 albums
Decca Records albums
Dualtone Records albums
The Lumineers albums